"The Purple People Eater" is a novelty song written and performed by Sheb Wooley, which reached No. 1 in the Billboard pop charts in 1958 from June 9 to July 14, No. 1 in Canada, reached No. 12 overall in the UK Singles Chart, and topped the Australian chart.

Composition
"The Purple People Eater" tells how a strange creature (described as a "one-eyed, one-horned, flying, purple people eater") descends to Earth because it wants to be in a rock 'n' roll band. The premise of the song came from a joke told by the child of a friend of Wooley's; Wooley finished composing it within an hour.

The song establishes that the creature eats purple people, but not whether or not it is itself purple:

The creature also declines to eat the narrator, "cause [he's] so tough".

The ambiguity of the song was present when it was originally played on the radio. In responses to requests from radio disc jockeys, listeners drew pictures that show a purple-colored "people eater".

The voice of the purple people eater is a sped-up recording, giving it a voice similar to, but not quite as high-pitched or as fast, as Mike Sammes's 1957 "Pinky and Perky", or Ross Bagdasarian's "Witch Doctor", another hit from earlier in 1958; and "The Chipmunk Song" which was released late in 1958. (Alvin and the Chipmunks themselves eventually covered "Purple People Eater" for their 1998 album The A-Files: Alien Songs.) The sound of a toy saxophone was produced in a similar fashion as the saxophone was originally recorded at a reduced speed.

Notable recordings
According to Wooley, MGM Records initially rejected the song, saying that it was not the type of music with which they wanted to be identified. An acetate of the song reached MGM Records' New York office. The acetate became popular with the office's young people. Up to 50 people would listen to the song at lunchtime. The front office noticed, reconsidered their decision, and decided to release the song.

The Sheb Wooley version crossed to the Billboard R&B Best Sellers in Stores chart, peaking at No. 18. 

Jackie Dennis covered the song in 1958, and his version reached No. 29 in the UK.

Judy Garland recorded the song on her 1958 Capitol Records album Garland at the Grove, accompanied by Freddy Martin & his Orchestra, issued as Capitol T 1118 (mono) and ST 1118 (stereo).

Wooley recorded another version of the song in 1967, titled "The Purple People Eater #2" and credited to his alter ego Ben Colder, on the MGM label.

A cover version recorded by British comedian Barry Cryer reached No. 1 in the Finnish chart after contractual reasons prevented Wooley's version being released in Scandinavia.

Wooley re-recorded the song in 1979 under the title "Purple People Eater", which Gusto Records released through its King Records subsidiary.

Popularity
The enduring popularity of the song led to the nicknaming of the highly effective "Purple People Eaters", the Minnesota Vikings defensive line of the 1970s, whose team colors include purple.

From 1982, major British toy manufacturer Waddingtons marketed a children's game inspired by the song. Players competed to remove tiny "people" from the rubber Purple People Eater shell, using tweezers on a wire loop which activated an alarm if coming into contact with its metal jaws.

In the 1984 post-apocalyptic novel Brother in the Land, cannibals are nicknamed "Purples," from the song.

The 2022 film Nope features a cinematographer, Antlers Holst, who is hired to capture an alien on camera. While preparing to capture camera footage of the alien creature, Holst recites the lyrics from "The Purple People Eater".

References

External links
 Singles listings on RCS Song Titles Index
 Hagen-Renaker ceramics

1958 singles
Sheb Wooley songs
Billboard Top 100 number-one singles
Cashbox number-one singles
Halloween songs
Number-one singles in Australia
Novelty songs
1958 songs
MGM Records singles
Songs written by Sheb Wooley
Comedy rock songs
Songs about extraterrestrial life
Songs about monsters